David Deaundra Rocker (born March 12, 1969) is a former American football player and coach.  He played professionally as a defensive tackle in the National Football League (NFL) for four seasons with the Los Angeles Rams (1991–1994). Rocker served as the head football coach at Point University in West Point, Georgia from 2013 to 2014. Rocker was born in Atlanta, Georgia, attended high school at Fulton High School—now known as South Atlanta High School—and played college football at Auburn University.

Personal life
Rockers older brother Tracy is also a former professional football player. His nephew, Kumar Rocker, is a pitcher for the Texas Rangers

Head coaching record

References

External links
 Point profile
 

1969 births
Living people
American football defensive tackles
Auburn Tigers football players
Los Angeles Rams players
Point Skyhawks football coaches
High school football coaches in Georgia (U.S. state)
All-American college football players
Players of American football from Atlanta
African-American coaches of American football
African-American players of American football
21st-century African-American people
20th-century African-American sportspeople